Édgar Hernán Jiménez (born 19 October 1984) is a Venezuelan international footballer who plays for Mineros de Guayana, as a midfielder.

Career
Jiménez has played for Caracas FC since 2003, winning the Venezuelan Primera División twice and the Copa Venezuela once.

He made his international debut for Venezuela in 2006.

References

1984 births
Living people
Venezuelan footballers
Venezuela international footballers
Caracas FC players
A.C.C.D. Mineros de Guayana players
Carabobo F.C. players
Deportivo La Guaira players
Venezuelan Primera División players
Association football midfielders